The sixth Norwegian Antarctic Expedition (Den norske antarktisekspedisjonen)  was a scientific expedition to Queen Maud's Land in Antarctica. The expedition was based at Norway Station which was located on the Fimbul Ice Shelf bordering the coast of Queen Maud Land.

The expedition carried out survey work and scientific studies for three-four years (1956–1960). The expedition was intended as part of Norway's participation in the International Geophysical Year, 1957-58. The crew set sail from Oslo on board two whaling ships, the Polarsirkel and Polarbjørn, on 10 November 1956.

The expedition was led by Sigurd Gunnarson Helle, a geodesist at Norsk Polarinstitutt. It included a total crew of fourteen researchers which was reduced to nine during the third year. Among their activities was topological mapping of the region.

In 1960, King Olav V of Norway instituted the Antarctic Medal (Antarktismedaljen) commemorating the expedition which was awarded to 37 people who were attached to the expedition in various ways.

References

Norwegian Antarctic Expedition
Expeditions from Norway
Norway and the Antarctic
1956 in Antarctica
1957 in Antarctica
1958 in Antarctica
1959 in Antarctica
1960 in Antarctica